Deputatsky (masculine), Deputatskaya (feminine), or Deputatskoye (neuter) is the name of several inhabited localities in Russia.

Urban localities
Deputatsky, an urban-type settlement in Ust-Yansky District of the Sakha Republic

Rural localities
Deputatsky, Chelyabinsk Oblast, a settlement in Yemanzhelinsky Selsoviet of Yetkulsky District of Chelyabinsk Oblast